The National Association of Charismatic and Christian Churches (NACCC) is an association of charismatic Christian churches in Ghana.

Origin

The NACCC plays a supervisory role to ensure that ministers maintain high moral standards.
Protestant churches in Ghana belonged to The Christian Council of Ghana or The Ghana Pentecostal and Charismatic Council (GPCC) until the NACCC was founded.
The NACCC was founded on 1 December 1999 by Dag Heward-Mills who was also elected twice as Chairman.
It had existed informally before that date.
The word "Christian" was included in the name to show that the organization was open to churches that shared its vision even if they did not consider themselves charismatic.
The NACCC defined one of its objectives as fostering close cooperation between its members and with other umbrella church organizations including the CCG, GPCC and the Council of Charismatic Churches.

History

The NACCC and the GPCC came to play an important role in the transmission of gospel teaching in Ghana. The older classical Pentecostals belong to the GPCC, while the younger, independent Charismatic ministries are NACCC members. The majority of charismatic churches now belong to the NACCC, but some are associated with the GPCC including the Perez Chapel International, Royal House Chapel International, Full Gospel Church International and the Christian Action Faith Ministry.
By May 2006 the NACCC had registered 119 member churches, each of whom agreed with the query, "Would you be faithful to ministry by upholding the highest standards of ministerial ethics, moral and financial rectitude, self-sacrifice, living a godly life and cherishing the call of God on your life?" Most of the members are Neo-Pentecostal.

In August 2003 Steve Mensah of Christian Evangelistic Ministry (CEM) was elected Chairman of the NACCC for a two-year term at the end of its four-day annual conference, replacing Dag Heward-Mills of Lighthouse Cathedral.
As of 2015 Archbishop Nicholas Duncan-Williams was chairman of the NACCC.

Since 2004 the NACCC has organized all Christians all night prayer vigils.

Members
As of 2015 the NACCC board members included representatives of the following churches or organizations:

 Action Chapel International
 Alabaster House Chapel
 Believers On Fire Int. Ministries
 Breakthrough Family Ministries International
 Breakthrough Prayer Chapel
 Charismatic Evangelistic Ministry (CEM)
 Charity House Chapel
 Christ Foundation Family Church
 Christ Home of Fellowship Ministry
 Christ Oil Fields Authority Church
 Compelling Power Chapel
 Covenant Family Community Chapel
 Cross Over Chapel
 Eternal Love Ministry (EWC)
 Faith Alive Chapel International
 Faith Missionary Church
 Family Chapel International
 Fruitfull Hill Chapel
 Global Revival Ministry
 Golden Street Chapel
 Gospel Light Int. Church
 Grace Gospel Church
 Grace Outreach Church
 Great Vision Ministry International
 Hall Of Strength Ministry
 Hallowed Temple International Church
 Harvest Chapel International
 Holy Fire Revival Ministry International
 International Charismatic Church
 International Full Bible Church
 International Revival Bible Church
 Kingdom Gate Chapel (Worldwide)
 Latter Rain Family Chapel International
 Liberation Bible Church
 Light of Life Gospel Mission
 Lighthouse Chapel International
 Living Grace Ministries
 Positive Faith International Ministry
 Power House Chapel
 Revival Flames Evangelistic Missions
 Sheepfold Chapel
 Solid Rock Chapel
 Springs of Life Chapel International.
 Triumph Bible Church International
 Triumphant Global Ministry
 World Missionary Church International (COCEM)
 World Outreach Gospel Mission

References

Sources

Christianity in Ghana